Wały may refer to the following places in Poland:
Wały, Lower Silesian Voivodeship (south-west Poland)
Wały, Nidzica County in Warmian-Masurian Voivodeship (north Poland)
Wały, Szczytno County in Warmian-Masurian Voivodeship (north Poland)